Higher Education Press (HEP) is a publisher in China of university and college-level textbooks, owned by Ministry of Education of the People's Republic of China. The company's headquarters is in Beijing. HEP was among the world Top 50 publishers.

HEP partnered with ScienceOpen in April 2016, indexing one of its flagship Open Access journals Frontiers of Agricultural Science and Engineering (FASE).

Journals

 Engineering
Frontiers of Architectural Research
Frontiers in Biology
Frontiers of Computer Science
Frontiers in Energy
Frontiers of Law in China
Frontiers of Medicine
Frontiers of Physics
Protein & Cell

References

Publishing companies of China